Yu Jinhao (born 12 November 1975 in Guangzhou) is a former Chinese badminton player. Yu joined the national team in 1997. He was part of the Chinese men's team that won the silver medal at the 1998 Asian Games in Bangkok, Thailand, and also won the bronze medal in the men's doubles event partnered with Liu Yong. He was ranked world No. 5 in the men's doubles in January 1999. Teamed with Chen Qiqiu, they competed at the 2000 Summer Olympics in Sydney, Australia. At the age of 25, due to injuries and other reasons, he left the national team. He works as a teacher in Yuyan Middle School and is a member of the Guangzhou CPPCC.

Achievements

Asian Games 
Men's doubles

World Junior Championships 
Boys' doubles

IBF World Grand Prix 
The World Badminton Grand Prix sanctioned by International Badminton Federation (IBF) since 1983.

Men's singles

Men's doubles

References

External links 
 
 
 余锦豪 Yu Jin Hao at www.badmintoncn.com

1977 births
Living people
Badminton players from Guangzhou
Chinese male badminton players
Badminton players at the 2000 Summer Olympics
Olympic badminton players of China
Badminton players at the 1998 Asian Games
Asian Games silver medalists for China
Asian Games bronze medalists for China
Asian Games medalists in badminton
Medalists at the 1998 Asian Games